Megalorhipida vivax is a moth of the family Pterophoridae. It is known from South Africa and Gambia.

References

Oxyptilini
Moths described in 1909
Insects of Africa
Moths of Africa
Fauna of the Gambia